Paul Robichaud (born May 6, 1964 in Tracadie, New Brunswick) is a politician in the province of New Brunswick, Canada.

He studied at the Shippagan, New Brunswick campus of the University of Moncton. A member of the Progressive Conservative Party since 1985, he first ran for office in the 1995 but was defeated.  He served from then until the next election as a Francophone organizer for the PC Party and ran again in 1999 when he was successful becoming the member of the Legislative Assembly of New Brunswick for Lamèque-Shippagan-Miscou.  He was re-elected in 2003, 2006 and 2010.

He joined the cabinet first as Minister of Fisheries & Aquaculture and then became minister of the enlarged Department of Agriculture, Fisheries and Aquaculture.  In a cabinet shuffle in 2001 he became Minister of Tourism & Parks a post he maintained until after the 2003 election when he took over the post of transportation.

He left the cabinet in 2006 as the Liberals won that year's election and formed the government.

References 
 MLA Bios, Government of New Brunswick

1964 births
Living people
Members of the Executive Council of New Brunswick
Progressive Conservative Party of New Brunswick MLAs
People from Gloucester County, New Brunswick
Acadian people
Deputy premiers of New Brunswick
21st-century Canadian politicians